is a Japanese manga series created by Atsushi Suzumi which was first serialized on June 27, 2005 in MediaWorks' shōnen manga magazine Dengeki Comic Gao!. The manga ended serialization in Dengeki Comic Gao! on February 27, 2008 due to the magazine's discontinuation, but the manga continued serialization in ASCII Media Works' manga magazine Dengeki Daioh between March 21 and July 26, 2008. Eight bound volumes have been released by ASCII Media Works in Japan. The manga has been licensed for English language distribution by North American–based company Seven Seas Entertainment; the first volume was released in July 2007. Later, a drama CD was created based on the manga series in October 2006. The series has since been adapted into an anime produced by Studio Hibari that aired in Japan between January and March 2007 on BS-i, containing twelve episodes.

Plot
Venus Versus Virus revolves around the life of two teenage girls named Sumire Takahana and Lucia Nahashi, who met when Sumire discovered Lucia's mysterious secret as a member of the Venus Vanguard, a group led by Lucia's adoptive father Soichiro which hunts demons called "Viruses". Now, while accepting jobs from people who find the Venus Vanguard brochure they fight off the "Viruses", while seeking the demons' true origins and motives as Lucia finds that Sumire is a lot more useful than she seems.

Characters

Main characters
 
 , Rina Satō (first drama CD)
 Sumire is a student at Shirogane Girls Academy and is the newest member of the Venus Vanguard, despite being terribly scared of Viruses and the fact that she's been able to see ghosts most of her life, even when she was a child. While initially she cannot be of much help to Lucia, they eventually find out that whenever her body reacts to the special chemical used to defeat Viruses (the so-called Vaccine), she transforms into a "Berserker Mode", or a living Anti-Virus. With this strange ability, she becomes stronger and violent, and is capable of defeating Viruses with her bare hands, but when under the influence of this power, she cannot discern friend from foe, although over the course of the series she learns how to control her powers. She has feelings for Yoshiki, a boy she met in the park.

 
 , Luci Christian (child) Hitomi Nabatame (first drama CD)
 Lucia is a strong girl who leads the fights against Viruses alongside the other members of the Venus Vanguard, sworn to fight and kill all Viruses. She is battlehardened and cold, but she shows a lot more facial expressions in the manga than in the anime. Her left eye holds a mysterious power, though is almost always covered with an eye patch. Use of her powers is taxing and wears her out, but can often be disastrous to her enemy in many ways. Her left arm has a symbol of the enchantment succeeded from her father. According to Sumire, Lucia often gives off a faint fragrance of roses, which is a scant memory of their intertwined pasts. She smokes in the manga.

 
 , Tamio Ōki (first drama CD)
 Soichiro is the guardian of Lucia, who loves her as if she were his real daughter-(the same goes for Lucia). Before Lucia was born, Soichiro was studying to become a mage, along with Lilith and Lucif, who are Lucia's biological mother and father respectively. He harbored an unrequited love for Lilith, but never got close with her as she was in love with Lucif.

 
 
 A mysterious blonde girl who lives with Lucia and Soichiro. She loves chocolate and is often seen eating it. She has a twin named Layla and in the anime neither of them seem to age since they are soulless dolls created by Lucif and Soichiro's teacher; in the manga they are orphaned girls with a telepathic link to one another. She is a major character right from the beginning in the anime, but in the manga she does not show up until the fourth volume. In the English version of the anime, her name is rendered as "Laura".

 
 
 Yoshiki is a young man Sumire met one day in a park while he was reading a book. After a few more meetings together while exchanging books to read, Yoshiki starts to develop romantic feelings for Sumire. In the anime it is later discovered that he is actually one of Lucif's followers named Aion, he tries to take Sumire's fragment but stops because he truly cared for her, thus, he betrays Lucif, but Lucia, not knowing of his betrayal, kills him. In the manga, Aion is a sorcerer who seems to possess Lucif and later Yoshiki.

Supporting characters

Nene is Sumire's female cousin who always tries to look out for her like an older sister. She often encourages her younger brother Riku in his attempts to ask Sumire out on a date.

Riku is Nene's younger brother who has a crush on Sumire. Multiple times, Riku attempts to ask Sumire out on a date, but something always interferes, leaving him heartbroken each time. He has a timid personality, which makes it even more difficult to ask Sumire out.

, Ai Nonaka (first drama CD)
Mika is one of Sumire's good friends and classmates. She has a tomboyish personality.

, Emiri Katō (first drama CD)
Kyōko is another one of Sumire's good friends and classmates.

, Kayo Sakata (first drama CD)
Shizu is another one of Sumire's good friends and classmates.

Lilith is Lucia's mother who once worked under a mentor with Lucif and Soichiro to learn magic arts, and in the anime after he died, their training ceased. Lilith fell in love with Lucif and eventually became pregnant with Lucia, though by the time she was born, Lucif was already gone on his quest for the True World. In the anime, a Virus allegedly killed Lilith when Lucia was still two years old. The Virus that killed her was Lucif so he could obtain her special fragment, although in the end, the fragment disappears. She killed herself to protect Lucia and the world that Lucif wanted to destroy.

Antagonists

Sonoka is the current leader of the Virus, and has a particular focused interest in Lucia and Sumire. She is a devoted follower of Aion (Lucif in the anime) and his quest to find the True World.

Ruka is a young girl who serves under Sonoka. She has a sadistic personality and has the power to control water and wind, though she states her specialty is electricity. In the English version of the anime, her name is rendered as "Luca".

Guy is another one of Sonoka's henchman. He has a similar personality to Ruka, and he has the power to control fire and earth.

Layla is Lola's twin. In the anime, after Lucif left to find the True World, Layla went with him and Lola stayed with Soichiro and Lilith. In the anime, Layla loves konpeito candy as much as Lola loves chocolate; in the manga, both twins are ardent fans of Pocky-like sticks, and are often seen munching on them. While in the anime, she is rather passive; in the manga, she gives off a more sinister presence.

Lucif is Lucia's father who, before she was born, left to find the path to the True World. His past is filled with mysteries, and Soichiro refuses to talk about the subject with Lucia. In the anime, it is thought he turned himself into a Virus so he could obtain the True World. In the manga, it appears he was possessed by Aion.

Media

Manga
Venus Versus Virus began as a manga series first serialized on June 27, 2005 in the shōnen magazine Dengeki Comic Gao! published by MediaWorks. On February 27, 2008, the manga ended serialization in Dengeki Comic Gao!, but continued serialization in ASCII Media Works' manga magazine Dengeki Daioh between March 21 and July 26, 2008. Eight bound volumes have been released in Japan by ASCII Media Works under their Dengeki Comics label. The manga has since been licensed in America by Seven Seas Entertainment with the first volume released in July 2007.

Venus Versus Virus has also been published in Taiwan and Hong Kong by Kadokawa Media, in South Korea by Samyang Publish Company, in Italy by J-Pop Edizioni, in France by Soleil Productions, in Spain by Norma Editorial, in Vietnam by Kim Dong Publishing House, and in Germany by Carlsen Verlag.

Drama CD
A drama CD based on the manga series was first released in Japan on October 25, 2006 produced by Frontier Works. The CD contained five tracks and the voice cast was different from that used in the anime adaptation. A second drama CD was released on April 4, 2007 produced by Lantis.

Anime
An anime television series adaptation was animated by Studio Hibari, directed by Shinichiro Kimura, and aired in Japan between January 11 and March 29, 2007 on the BS-i network, containing twelve episodes. The anime was made available in November 2007 on Anime Network's Video on demand setup. The anime was originally licensed by ADV Films for distribution in North America, but in July 2008, the anime became one of over thirty ADV titles transferred to Funimation Entertainment. ADV Films had also licensed Venus Versus Virus for release in Germany, but the DVDs were put on hold. MVM Entertainment will release the TV series on region 2 DVD on May 30, 2022 in the original NTSC format, in the UK.

Music
The anime's opening theme is "Bravin' Bad Brew" by Riryka, and the ending theme is "Shijun no Zankoku" by Yousei Teikoku. The anime's original soundtrack contains background music composed by Hikaru Nanase. The soundtrack was released on April 25, 2007. A vocal CD, containing songs and monologues by four of the voice actresses from the anime, was released on March 21, 2007.

Explanatory notes

References

External links
 Venus Versus Virus  at Seven Seas Entertainment
 Anime official website 
 Venus Versus Virus at Funimation Entertainment
 

2005 manga
2007 Japanese television series debuts
2007 Japanese television series endings
ADV Films
Anime series based on manga
ASCII Media Works manga
Dark fantasy anime and manga
Dengeki Comic Gao!
Dengeki Comics
Dengeki Daioh
Funimation
Girls with guns anime and manga
Japanese LGBT-related television shows
Kadokawa Dwango franchises
Seven Seas Entertainment titles
Shōnen manga
Studio Hibari
Supernatural thriller anime and manga
TBS Television (Japan) original programming